Rahul Raju is an Indian professional footballer who plays as a forward for I-League club Gokulam Kerala, currently on a loan from Indian Super League club Bengaluru.

Club career

Youth
Born in the football frenzy state of Kerala, Rahul Raju kicked-off his career at an early age with the local clubs United Kochin FC and SB FA Poovar of Thiruvananthapuram later. He then caught the attention of Bengaluru FC scouts and was roped in by the club for their reserves side in 2021.

Bengaluru FC
Rahul Raju began his senior career at the fourth tier football of India with Bengaluru FC B at the 2021-22 season of BDFA Super Division. He scored five goals for the club and had one assist to his name.

The reserves side of Bengaluru FC participated in the maiden season of Reliance Foundation Development League in 2022 and it was a tournament to remember for the then-eighteen-year-old as he went on to secure the golden boot in the tournament with seven goals in seven games for the club who became the league premiers.

Gokulam Kerala FC
After tasting success with Bengaluru FC B, Rahul Raju was loaned out for a season, back to his home state of Kerala but this time to the northern part of the state where the I-League club Gokulam Kerala FC is based. Rahul Raju started for the club fifteen times and found back of the net once in the 2022–23 season of I-League.

Statistics

Honours
Bengaluru FC B
 Reliance Foundation Development League : 2022

Individual
 2022 Reliance Foundation Development League : Golden Boot

References

External links
Bengaluru FC Profile
Sofascore Profile
Soccerway Profile

Living people
2003 births
People from Thiruvananthapuram district
Indian footballers
Footballers from Kerala
Association football forwards
 Bangalore Super Division players
Bengaluru FC players
I-League players
Gokulam Kerala FC players